Walter Suffield (died 19 May 1257) was a medieval Bishop of Norwich.

Life
Suffield was a canonist at Paris before his election to the see of Norwich about 9 July 1244. He was consecrated on 26 February 1245. He was an eloquent preacher, and showed generosity to the poor (during one famine, even selling some of his own goods in order to provide them with food).

In 1249, he founded St. Giles's Hospital in Norwich (which remains in use as the Great Hospital to this day) to provide care for the poor. He died on 19 May 1257, leaving bequests to both the poor and the hospital.

Citations

References
 British History Online Bishops of Norwich accessed on 29 October 2007
 
 

Bishops of Norwich
1257 deaths
Year of birth unknown
13th-century English Roman Catholic bishops